Guddi Devi also known as Guddi Choudhary is an Indian politician. She was first elected as a member of the Bihar Legislative Assembly in 2005 as the representative of the Runnisaidpur constituency and member of the Janta Dal (United) party (JD(U)). In 2005 the JD(U) formed an alliance with the Bharatiya Janta Party (BJP) and the National Democratic Alliance (NDA) to form a government in Bihar. In 2010 she was re-elected for a second term. On 20 September 2015 Devi resigned from the JD(U) party having completed two terms but joined the Samajwadi party to contest the 2015 Assembly election. In 2020, Devi joined the Lok Jan Shakti Party (LJP) and represented them in the Runnisaidpur constituency election. She joined Bharatiya Janta Party (BJP) on 10 October 2022 along with her massive supporters.

References

Janata Dal (United) politicians
Bihar MLAs 2005–2010
Bihar MLAs 2010–2015
People from Sitamarhi district
People from Bihar
Lok Janshakti Party politicians
Year of birth missing (living people)
Living people
Women members of the Bihar Legislative Assembly
21st-century Indian women politicians